The Cuesta sea cow (Hydrodamalis cuestae) is an extinct herbivorous marine mammal and is the direct ancestor of the Steller's sea cow (Hydrodamalis gigas). They were first described in 1978 by Daryl Domning when fossils in California were unearthed. Its appearance and behavior are largely based on that of the well-documented Steller's sea cow, which, unlike the Cuesta sea cow, lived into modern times and was well-described.

Taxonomy and extinction

The fossils of the Cuesta sea cow were first discovered in the Late Pliocene sediment formations of Pismo Beach, California in 1978, and successive finds of the species were unearthed elsewhere in California. In 1988, fossils of sea cows were discovered in Hokkaido that were originally assigned to the Takikawa sea cow (H. spissa), a newly described species, but this is thought of by some scientists as a synonym of H. cuestae. It is uncertain whether or not H. spissa was simply a local variant of H. cuestae or a completely separate lineage. The Steller's sea cow was apparently a direct descendant of the Cuesta sea cow.

The Cuesta sea cow went extinct around 2½ million years ago. The disappearance of the Cuesta sea cow was likely linked to the onset of the Quaternary glaciation. Its main food source of seagrasses declined, due to the cooling of the oceans, to a point where it could no longer support the population. In addition, this sea cow was not adapted to the cold, and those that were probably gave rise to the Steller's sea cow.

Biology and behavior
The Cuesta sea cow, like the Steller's sea cow, was probably gregarious and lived in small family groups. The bones were dense and served as a sort of ballast to prevent floating, probably so that they could feed on bottom-dwelling sea grasses. Sea grasses were their preferred food source. They most likely 'walked' along the shallow seafloor using their front limbs, using their powerful tail fin for propulsion. It has been speculated that, like the Steller's sea cows, the front limbs were used as holdfasts. The body was fusiform, tapered at both the head and tail.

See also
Steller's sea cow
Takikawa sea cow
Hydrodamalinae

References

Pleistocene sirenians
Prehistoric mammals of Asia
Fossil taxa described in 1978